Planning commissions are governmental bodies that make decisions about either Land-use planning or Economic planning, depending on the jurisdiction. 

Land-use commissions:
Planning committee, a local planning authority in the United Kingdom
Planning and Zoning Commission, a local government planning body in the United States

Economic commissions:
Gosplan, Soviet economic planning commission
Bangladesh Planning Commission, financial and public policy development institution of the Government of Bangladesh
Planning Commission (India), economic institution of India that formulated its five-year plans (abolished 2016, see NITI Aayog)
Planning Commission (Pakistan), similar institution in Pakistan that formulates its five-year plans